The Nautilitoidea is a superorder within the subclass Nautiloidea, comprising the phylogenetically related Nautilida, Oncocerida, and Tarphycerida.

The superorder has its roots in the Bassleroceratidae, the ancestral family of the Tarphycerida, sometimes included in the Ellesmerocerida. The Bassleroceratidae also gave rise to the Granciloceratidae, the ancestral family of the Oncocerida, which in turn gave rise to the Nautilida, which includes the Nautilidae which includes the living Nautilus.

By having the ancestral Bassleroceratidae in the Tarphycerida, the Nautilitoidea becomes monophyletic. With the Bassleroceratidae in the Ellesmerocerida, the Tarphycerida becomes distinct from the oncocerid-nautilid lineage, making the Nautilitoidea polyphyletic.

References
 Wade, M. 1988. Nautiloids and their descendants: cephalopod classification in 1986.
Memoir 44, pp 15–25; New Mexico Bureau of Mines and Mineral Resources, Socorro, NM

See also
 Bernhard.  Nautiloidea - Nautilida, Treatise on Invertebrate Paleontology Part K.  Geological Soc of America and Univ of Kansas Press, R.C. Moore (Ed) 1964.
Furnish  & Glenister.  Nautiloidea - Tarphycerida  ibid
Sweet, W. C. Nautiloidea - Barrandeocerida   ibid
Sweet, W. C. Nautilodiea - Oncocerida  ibid

Nautiloids
Protostome superorders